The Representative may refer to:

 The Representative (newspaper), a London newspaper published in 1826
 The Representative (play) or The Deputy, a 1963 play by Rolf Hochhuth
 The Representative, 2011 film with Kevin Dobson

See also
Representative (disambiguation)
Representation (disambiguation)